The ,  also known as Tokyō (都響), is one of the representative symphony orchestras of Japan. The Orchestra was founded in 1965 by the Tokyo Metropolitan Government, to commemorate the Tokyo Olympics (1964 Summer Olympics).

Currently Kazushi Ono serves as Music Director, Alan Gilbert as Principal Guest Conductor, Kazuhiro Koizumi as Honorary Conductor for Life and Eliahu Inbal as Conductor Laureate.

Their offices are based at the Tokyo Bunka Kaikan, a concert venue owned by the Tokyo Metropolitan Government.  They perform regularly at Tokyo Bunka Kaikan, Suntory Hall and Tokyo Metropolitan Theatre.

Traditionally, the Orchestra performs the works of Gustav Mahler as an important part of their repertoire. Hiroshi Wakasugi, Eliahu Inbal and Gary Bertini have performed all the symphonies of Mahler with the orchestra.

The Orchestra has received much international acclaim through overseas performances in Europe, North America and Asia. In November 2015, They brought a tour in Europe under the baton of Kazushi Ono, which was highly acclaimed.

Conductors 
 Kazushi Ono (2015–) Music Director
 Alan Gilbert (conductor) (2018–) Principal Guest Conductor
 Eliahu Inbal (2008–2014) Principal Conductor
 Jakub Hrůša　(2010–2018) Principal Guest Conductor
 James DePreist (2005–2008) Permanent Conductor
 Gary Bertini (1998–2005) Music Director
 Kazuhiro Koizumi (1995–1998) Principal Conductor
 Hiroshi Wakasugi (1986–1995) Music Director
 Jean Fournet (1983–1986) Permanent Guest-Conductor
 Moshe Atzmon (1978–1983) Music Adviser & Principal Conductor
 Akeo Watanabe (1972–1978) Music Director & Permanent Conductor
 Tadashi Mori (1967–1972) Music Director & Permanent Conductor
 Heinz Hofmann (1965–1967) Music Director & Permanent Conductor

Awards 

 Kyoto Music Award (1991)

 Japan's 50th Record Academy Award for Best Symphony Album (E.Inbal/ Shostakovich: Symphony No.4, 2012)

 Japan's 53rd Record Academy Award for Special Award (E.Inbal+TMSO/ Neuer Mahler-Zyklus 2012–2013)

Note 
 The Tokyo Metropolitan Symphony Orchestra (都響, Tokyō) tends to be confused with the Tokyo Symphony Orchestra (東響, Tōkyō).
 The orchestra had mainly performed only classical music but came to also perform other symphonic music since around 2000, such as Dragon Quest soundtracks with Koichi Sugiyama, and soundtracks for Nodame Cantabile (anime and TV drama) and Red Cliff (film).

External links 
 

Musical groups established in 1965
Japanese orchestras
Culture in Tokyo
Government of Tokyo
Musical groups from Tokyo
1965 establishments in Japan